Plesiodema pinetella is a true bug. The species is found across Palearctic from Europe and  Western North Africa East to Siberia and Central Asia.

Plesiodema pinetella feeds on Pinus, spruce Picea and Larix  but in Central Europe especially on Pinus sylvestris, and Pinus nigra, and at higher altitudes in the Alps on mountain pine Pinus mugo. The imagines occur from late May to early July, where their life expectancy is only about two weeks.

References

 Ekkehard Wachmann, Albert Melber, Jürgen Deckert: Wanzen. Band 2: Cimicomorpha: Microphysidae (Flechtenwanzen), Miridae (Weichwanzen) (= Die Tierwelt Deutschlands und der angrenzenden Meeresteile nach ihren Merkmalen und nach ihrer Lebensweise. 75. Teil). Goecke & Evers, Keltern 2006, S. 255

Hemiptera of Europe
Miridae
Insects described in 1828